The 1908 College Football All-America team is composed of college football players who were selected as All-Americans for the 1908 college football season. The only two individuals who have been recognized as "official" selectors by the National Collegiate Athletic Association (NCAA) for the 1908 season are Walter Camp and Caspar Whitney, who had originated the College Football All-America Team 14 years earlier in 1889.  Camp's 1908 All-America Team was published in Collier's Weekly, and Whitney's selections were published in Outing magazine.

Many other sports writers, newspapers, coaches and others also selected All-America teams in 1910.  The Philadelphia Inquirer published a consensus All-America team based on the first-team All-America selections made by 25 football experts.

Consensus All-Americans
The only two individuals who have been recognized as "official" selectors by the National Collegiate Athletic Association (NCAA) for the 1908 season are Walter Camp and Caspar Whitney, who had originated the College Football All-America Team 14 years earlier in 1889.  In its official listing of "Consensus All-America Selections," the NCAA designates players who were selected by either  Camp or Whitney as "consensus" All-Americans.  Using this criteria, the NCAA recognizes 16 players as "consensus" All-American for the 1908 football season.  The consensus All-Americans are identified in bold on the list below ("All-Americans of 1908").

All-American selections for 1908

Ends
Hunter Scarlett, Penn (College Football Hall of Fame) (WC-1; CON-1 [23]; ERB-1 [30]; NYW; PI; FY; TT; NYG; CSM; NYET; BSU; BP; PD; TJ; KCJ; PP; PT; PES; WH; FC)
George Schildmiller, Dartmouth (WC-1; CON-1 [18]; ERB-1 [23]; PI; TT; NYG; NYT; NYET; BSU; BP; PD; PT; PES; CIO; FC)
Claude Fisher, Syracuse (NYW; FY; TJ; KCJ)
Frank Dennie, Brown (WC-2; CSM; NHR)
Lawrence Fairfax Reifsnider, Navy (WC-2)
Harlan Page, Chicago (WC-3)
Ronald D. Johnson, Army (WC-3)
George Kennedy, Dartmouth (NYT; NHR; WH)
Gilbert Goodwin Browne, Harvard (PP)

Tackles

Hamilton Fish, Harvard (WC-1; CON-1 [14]; ERB-1 [25]; PI; FY; TT; NYG; CSM; NYT; BSU; BP; KCJ; PT; FC)
Bill Horr, Syracuse (WC-1; CON-2 [9]; NYG; NYET; PD [g]; PES [g])
Percy Northcroft, Navy (WC-3; CIO)
Dexter Draper, Penn (WC-3; CON-1 [13]; ERB-1 [25]; PI; TT; BSU; BP; PD; NHR; PP; PT; PES; WH; FC)
Rudolph Siegling, Princeton (WC-2; CON-2 [11]; NYW-1; NYT; BP [g]; PD; TJ; PP; WH; CIO)
Daniel Pullen, Army (NYW; FY; TJ; KCJ)
Robert McKay, Harvard (CSM)
Arthur Brides, Yale (NHR)

Guards
Hamlin Andrus, Yale (WC-2; CON-1 [13]; ERB-1 [18]; NYW; NYT; NYET; BSU; TJ; KCJ; PT; PES)
William Goebel, Yale (WC-1; CON-1 [16]; PI; FY; TT; NYG; CSM; NYT; PD; NHR; PP; WH; CIO; FC)
Bernard O'Rourke, Cornell (WC-2 [t]; NYET; PES; WH [g])
Clark Tobin, Dartmouth (WC-1; CON-2 [12]; ERB-1 [28]; PI; FY; TT; NYG; CSM; NYET; BSU; BP; KCJ)
Samuel Hoar, Harvard (WC-3; NYW; TJ; PP)
Francis Burr, Havard (PT)
John Messmer, Wisconsin (WC-2)
Forest Van Hook, Illinois (WC-3)
Orlo L. Waugh, Syracuse (NHR)
Edward Rich, Dartmouth (FC)

Centers
Charles Nourse, Harvard (WC-1; CON-1 [12]; NYG; NYT; CIO [g])
Germany Schulz, Michigan (College Football Hall of Fame) (CON-2 [9]; ERB-1 [20]; NYW; PI; FY; TT; CSM; NYET; BSU; BP; PD; NHR; TJ; KCJ; PP; PT; PES)
Wallace Philoon, Army (WC-2; WH; CIO; FC)
Joseph C. Brusse, Dartmouth (WC-3)

Quarterbacks

Walter Steffen, Chicago (College Football Hall of Fame) (WC-1; FY; NYET; PD; NHR; KCJ)
Ed Lange, Navy (CON-1 [12]; TT; NYG; BP; PP; WH; CIO)
Allie Miller, Penn (WC-3; CON-2 [6]; ERB-1 [20]; PI; BSU; TJ; PT; PES; FC)
Johnny Cutler, Harvard (WC-2; CSM; NYT)

Halfbacks
Hamilton Corbett, Harvard (CIO)
Bill Hollenback, Penn (College Football Hall of Fame)  (WC-1; CON-1 [21]; ERB-1 [30]; NYW; PI; FY; TT; NYG; NYT; NYET; BSU; BP; PD; TJ; KCJ; PP; PT; PES; WH; FC)
Frederick Tibbott, Princeton (WC-1; CON-1 [21]; ERB-1 [25]; NYW; FY; TT; CSM; NYT; NYET; BSU; BP; NHR; TJ; KCJ; PP; PT; PES; WH; CIO)
Jim Thorpe, Carlisle (College and Pro Football Hall of Fame) (WC-3; PI)
Ernest Frederocl Ver Wiebe, Harvard (WC-2; CSM; NHR)
John W. Mayhew, Brown (WC-2)
Edward Gray, Amherst (WC-3)

Fullbacks

Ted Coy, Yale (College Football Hall of Fame) (WC-1; CON-1 [24]; ERB-1 [30]; NYW; PI; FY; TT; NYG; CSM; NYT; NYET; BSU; BP; PD; NHR; TJ; KCJ; PP; PT; PES; WH; CIO [e]; FC)
George Walder, Cornell (WC-2; CIO; FC; PD [hb])
George McCaa, Lafayette (WC-3)

Key
NCAA recognized selectors for 1908
 WC = Collier's Weekly as selected by Walter Camp

Other selectors
 CON = Consensus based on All-American teams selected by 25 football experts; number indicates how many of the 25 experts selected the individual as a first-team All-American; any player with at least 5 of 25 selections is listed hear as a second-team selection: CON-2
 ERB = Composite All-America team selected by E. R. Bushnell based on aggregating the opinions of 30 football critics; number indicates how many of the 30 critics selected the individual as a first-team All-American
 NYW = New York World, selected by former Yale quarterback Tad Jones
 PI = The Philadelphia Inquirer, selected by Franklin
 FY = Fielding H. Yost, football coach of the University of Michigan
 TT = Tom Thorpe, former star tackle and captain of Columbia
 NYG = New York Globe
 CSM = The Christian Science Monitor
 NYT = The New York Times
 NYET = New York Evening Telegram
 BSU = Brooklyn Standard Union
 BP = Boston Post
 PD = Pittsburgh Dispatch
 NHR = New Haven Register
 TJ = Tad Jones
 KCJ = Kansas City Journal
 PP = Philadelphia Press
 PT = Philadelphia Times
 PES = Philadelphia Evening Star
 WH = Washington Herald, selected by William Peet
 CIO = Chicago Inter-Ocean
 FC = Fred Crolius

Bold = Consensus All-American
 1 – First-team selection
 2 – Second-team selection
 3 – Third-team selection

See also
 1908 All-Southern college football team
 1908 All-Western college football team

References

All-America Team
College Football All-America Teams